Ernest Jenning / Ernest Jenning Record Co. is an independent record label established in 2002 in Jersey City, New Jersey. EJRC has been based out of Brooklyn, NY since 2003. The label is run by Pete D'Angelo and Gandhar Savur, and is home to artists including Versus, Built to Spill, O'Death, Wild Yaks, Bomb the Music Industry!, The Rentals, Savak, Takka Takka, Title Tracks, Still Flyin', Nonconnah, The Black Hollies, Dälek, Saturday Looks Good to Me, Chris Mills and many more

In August 2015, the label announced its first artist imprint - Khannibalism - overseen by Berlin-based soul/garage artist King Khan.

Discography

EJRC176 Savak - Rotting Teeth in the Horse's Mouth
EJRC172/KK013 King Khan / The Sadies - The Most Despicable Man Alive b/w Old Gunga Din 7-inch
EJRC171 Je Suis France - Touch of Greg
EJRC170 Je Suis France - Back to the Basics of Love
EJRC167 Built to Spill Plays the Songs of Daniel Johnston
EJRC165 Blood Warrior - Animal Hides 
EJRC164 Savak - Mirror Maker EP 
EJRC163 Scoville Unit - S/T 
EJRC162/KK012 Saba Lou - Novum Ovum 
EJRC161 Flower - Tour Flexi - Names b/w Talk
EJRC159 Versus - Ex Voto
EJRC158 +/- {Plus/Minus} - Summer 2019 - EP
EJRC157 Versus - Ex Nihilo EP 
EJRC156 Nonconnah - Seek Not Your Fortune
EJRC155 Nonconnah - Dead Roses, Digged Up Zombies, Broken Pieces of Diamonds, Live Cats
EJRC154/KK010 The King Khan Experience - Turkey Ride
EJRC153 Paws - Your Church on My Bonfire
EJRC152/KK009 King Khan and the Shrines - Three Hairs and You're Mine
EJRC151 Kudzu Wish - Kudzu Wish
EJRC150 Savak - Beg Your Pardon
EJRC148/KK008 The Black Lips & The Khan Family
EJRC146 Sunshine and the Rain - Beneath the Stars
EJRC145 High Disciple - High Disciple
EJRC143 Smart Went Crazy - CON ART (20th Anniversary Reissue)
EJRC142 Savak - Cut-Ups
EJRC141 Joel Michael Howard - 5th Grade Part B
EJRC140/KK007 King Khan - Murderburgers
EJRC139 Double Ferrari - Double Ferrari
EJRC138 Sunshine and the Rain - In the Darkness of My Night
EJRC137 Hunter Simpson - Goldmine
EJRC136 Trummors - Headlands
EJRC135 Las Rosas - Everyone Gets Exactly What They Want 
EJRC134 Saint Pé - Fixed Focus
EJRC133 Doc Hopper - ...Ask Your Mom 
EJRC132 Doc Hopper - Aloha
EJRC131/KK006 Saba Lou - Planet Enigma 
EJRC130 Joel Michael Howard - I Feel Nauseous
EJRC129 Title Tracks - Long Dream
EJRC128/KK005 King Khan - America Goddamn
EJRC127 Exit Verse - Grant No Glory
EJRC126/KK004 King Khan - Never Hold On
EJRC124 North Collins - North Collins
EJRC123 Sunshine and the Rain - Can't Stop Thinking About You b/w Pale Blue Skies
EJRC122/KK003 William S. Burroughs - Let Me Hang You
EJRC121 Still Flyin' - Perfect Future
EJRC120/KK002 King Khan feat. Ian Svenonius - Hurtin' Class
EJRC119/KK0081 King Khan feat. Natalia Avelon Bandit Queen
EJRC118 The Everymen - These Mad Dogs Need Heroes
EJRC117 The Everymen - Under the Covers with the Everyme
EJRC116 Dead Gaze - Easy Travels
EJRC115 Joel Michael Howard - Love as First Response
EJRC114 Miniboone - Bad Sports
EJRC113 Wild Yaks - Rejoice! God Loves Wild Yaks
EJRC112 The Everymen - Givin' Up on Free Jazz
EJRC111 Grandchildren - Zuni
EJRC110 Daytona - Daytona
EJRC109 Dinosaur Feathers - Control
EJRC108 Exit Verse - Exit Verse
EJRC107 Clawman - Tillson Tapes
EJRC106 Trummors - Moorish Highway
EJRC105 Super Lonely - Attachments
EJRC104 Jeff Rosenstock - Summer Seven Club
EJRC103 Grandchildren - Golden Age
EJRC102 The Albertans - Dangerous Anything
EJRC101 Miniboone - Miniboone
EJRC100 The Black Hollies - Somewhere Between Here and Nowhere
EJRC099 Shannon Wright - In Film Sound
EJRC098 Action Beat + G.W. Sok - A Remarkable Machine
EJRC097 Risk Relay - After Fake End Times
EJRC096 Wild Yaks - Million Years
EJRC095 Philip Glass - ReWork
EJRC094 Shannon Wright - Secret Blood
EJRC093 Still Flyin - On A Bedroom Wall
EJRC092 Still Flyin - Travelin' Man 7-inch
EJRC091 The Albertans - The Hunter 7-inch
EJRC090 Trummors - Over and Around the Clove
EJRC089 Drew Isleib - Stride
ERJC088 Fred Thomas - Kuma
ERJC087 Nouvellas - Never Go Home
ERJC086 Bomb the Music Industry! - Vacation
ERJC085 Takka Takka - A.M Landscapes
ERJC084 The Rentals - Present "Resilience"
ERJC083 Gabriel & The Hounds - Kiss Full of Teeth
ERJC082 Dinosaur Feathers - Whistle Tips
ERJC081 O'Death - Outside
ERJC080 La Strada - In Motion
ERJC079 Title Tracks - In Blank
ERJC078 Lifeguards - Waving at the Astronauts
EJRC077 Adam Thorn & The Top Buttons - Adam Thorn & The Top Buttons CD
ERJC076 The Forms - Derealization CD
ERJC075 Lifeguards - Product Head 7-inch
ERJC074 Chris Mills - Heavy Years
ERJC073 Quinn Marston - Can You Hear Me See Me Now?
ERJC072 Charles Burst - Neighbor Song b/w Idiot Song 7-inch
ERJC071 Still Flyin' - Neu Ideas CD
ERJC070 Still Flyin' - Victory Walker 7-inch
ERJC069 Still Flyin' - A Party in Motion EP
ERJC068 Still Flyin' - Runaway Train II
ERJC067 The Albertans - New Age
ERJC066 Charles Burst - The Famous Patient
ERJC065 La Strada - New Home
ERJC064 Kudrow - Lando 7-inch
ERJC063 Blood Warrior - Blood Warrior
ERJC062 Title Tracks - It Was Easy
ERJC061 Houston McCoy - No Art Vol.1 7-inch
ERJC060 Wild Yaks - 10 Ships (Don't Die Yet!)
ERJC059 Miss TK & The Revenge - The Ocean Likes to Party Too
ERJC058 Blood Warrior - Darling Eyes 7-inch
ERJC057 Cuff The Duke - Way Down Here
ERJC056 The Black Hollies - Softly Towards the Light
ERJC055 Miss TK & The Revenge - No Biterz EP
ERJC054 Pegasuses-XL - Psychic Entourage
ERJC053 Nouvellas - Nouvellas
ERJC052 The Albertans - Legends of Sam Marco CD
ERJC051 Skeletonbreath - Eagle's Next, Devil's Cave CD
ERJC050 Dalek - Gutter Tactics 2xLP
ERJC049 La Strada - EP
ERJC048 Still Flyin' - Never Gonna Touch the Ground
ERJC047 Skeletonbreath - Louise
ERJC046 Pegasuses-XL - Electro Agitators
ERJC045 The Measure (sa) / Flamingo 50 - split 7-inch
ERJC044 Saturday Looks Good To Me - Springtime Judgment
ERJC043 Charles Burst - Come Home and Feast
ERJC042 Nouvellas - Satisfied b/w Right Kind of Woman
ERJC041 The Albertans - Sex with an Angel EP
ERJC040 Takka Takka - Migration
ERJC038 Chris Mills - Atom Smashers
ERJC037 Pegasuses-XL - The Antiphon
ERJC036 The Black Hollies - Casting Shadows
ERJC035 O'Death - Low Tide b/w I Think I'm Fine
ERJC034 Takka Takka – We Feel Safer at Night
EJRC033 Risk Relay - Curses Sing
ERJC032 O'Death - Head Home
EJRC031 Dälek - Abandoned Language
EJRC017 Fizzle Like a Flood - The Love LP
EJRC029 The Black Hollies / The Dansettes - Hush b/w Forty Days
EJRC028 Adam Thorn & The Top Buttons - Where's the Freedom?
EJRC027 Saturday Looks Good To Me - Money in the Afterlife
EJRC026 Health - Where You From
EJRC025 Houston McCoy - The Pegasus
EJRC024 Scoville Unit - Closed Universe
EJRC023 The Black Hollies - Crimson Reflections
EJRC022 Drew Isleib - Landing
EJRC021 The Occasion - Cannery Hours LP
EJRC020 The Black Hollies - Tell Me What You Want
EJRC019 Flamingo 50 - Tear It Up
EJRC018 Chris Mills - The Wall to Wall Sessions
EJRC017 Fizzle Like a Flood - Golden Sand and the Grandstand
EJRC016 Heston Rifle - At the Time of Accident...
EJRC015 Kudzu Wish - En Route
EJRC014 Drew Isleib - The Build
EJRC013 Taxpayer - I'll Do My Best to Stay Healthy
EJRC012 Houston McCoy - self-titled
EJRC011 Fizzle Like A Flood - self-titled EP
EJRC010 Scoville Unit - Everybody Knows
EJRC009 Denise Hradecky - Invisible Thread
EJRC008 Kudzu Wish - Reverse Hurricane
EJRC007 Disband - In Small Rooms
EJRC006 Risk Relay - Low Frequency Listener
EJRC005 Fizzle Like A Flood - Flash Paper Queen (The 4-Track Demos)
EJRC004 Disband / Kudzu Wish - At ahe Scene of the Accident
EJRC003 Drew Isleib - Sounds Through the Wall
EJRC002 El Secondhand - Crack and Divide
EJRC001 The Quick Fix (Kills) - Novel Weapons

References

External links
 Official Site
 Interview with Label in Yes Weekly

American independent record labels
Record labels established in 2002